Emelie Tina Forsberg (born December 11, 1986) is a Swedish athlete specializing in trail running (skyrunning, mountain running) and ski mountaineering. She has won repeated victories in different disciplines, including European and World Championships.

Ian Corless described Forsberg as: "Known for her incredible strength, endurance and break neck downhill running, she has also become an inspiration to men and ladies all over the world by her infectious passion and love of life which she daily shares via social media. No matter how hard the race, no matter how tough the conditions are, no matter how bad she is feeling, Emelie is guaranteed to provide a smile."

Biography

Childhood and youth

Her father died when she was new-born and according to Forsberg her mother had a tough time combining work, studies and taking care of her two daughters. Orienteering, trekking, climbing, skiing, foraging for mushrooms and berries were an integral part of her life since she was very young.

In a 2017 public lecture Forsberg stated that between 15 and 20 years of age she defined herself as a climber.
She moved to the Swedish mountains at age 18 and worked as a waitress in the Storulvån Mountain Lodge in the Åre Ski Area, where she convinced her boss to send her to a baking course. While living in Storulvån, Forsberg ran in the mountains in her spare time for love of nature, for the fun of it, and as a means of transportation.

Early career

Forsberg's first serious trail race was the Swedish Fjällmaraton in 2009. She had borrowed a backpack from a friend and brought a chocolate mud cake that she had baked. Before the last big ascent she stopped for 20 minutes and ate the cake, got new energy and won the race. Two years later she was back, did not stop to eat en route and improved her time by 30 minutes. In 2014 when an established world class runner Forsberg was back again, improved her time by another 30 minutes and set a new course record.

In 2011 Forsberg worked at the Turtagrø Hotel in Hurrungane on the outskirts of Jotunheimen National Park in Norway. In May 2012 she was invited to run in an international trail event, Zegama-Aizkorri Mendi Maratoia, where she finished in 3rd place. Her following trail event in July 2012, the Dolomites Skyrace, she won. Says Forsberg: "It was insane. It was cool to realize that what I had been doing in my solitude in the Swedish mountains was a big sport in the Alps". Forsberg moved from Storulvån to Tromsø in Norway, in order to study at the University of Tromsø, and run in the mountains there.

Prior to late 2012 Forsberg had no serious competition experience in ski mountaineering. Her first race was in Chamonix on December 9 where she placed third. Forsberg: "I was just back form The North Face 50 mile race in San Francisco and had maybe 3 days of skiing on a pair of Kilians old skis and said yes to join the race. Yeay! Oh man it was so fun! I didn´t really understod how the binding worked (I was a telemarker and a x country skier!)so I lost my skis in the uphill, I lost my skins and so many more small mistakes. But I enjoyed it, I had fun and I pushed hard."
 In late December she placed second in a Swedish race in Åre after losing her ski skins and running one out of eight laps on foot. Shortly after, in January 2013, she won the Norwegian Championship by seven minutes over her closest rival, upon which she embarked on another round of skiing so that she was not available for interviews after her victory. She followed up with Alpiniski later in the same month. In early February she became French champion in the vertical event and a week later won bronze medals in the sprint and vertical events at the World Championships.

Professional career
In the Skyrunning World Series Forsberg has been especially successful in the Ultra Series where she won every race in 2013-2015 except for the 2014 Trofeo Kima where she took a wrong turn when four hours into the race and half an hour below the course record time; she descended  and had to ascend again, losing one hour, then worked her way back up the field to 2nd position.

Forsberg runs 10 km in 36 minutes. She is also a strong uphill runner as witnessed by her results in vertical kilometer races. But her real strength is downhill running where she constantly outruns her competitors and sets new records. Says Forsberg: "I’m so comfortable in that terrain so it doesn’t feel fast at all. Training helps and also I think it makes a lot of difference that I have always just played outside running on trails, rocks etc."
Forsberg claims that she has only fallen twice while running, once during the 2014 Transvulcania race where she fell running uphill after being pushed from behind and sustained a hand and arm injury that required immediate medical care, once on a road when running with her boyfriend.

In ski mountaineering Forsberg's greatest achievement is in her own opinion winning the biennial Trofeo Mezzalama in 2015 with teammates Axelle Mollaret and Jennifer Fiechter, barely three minutes ahead of world champions Laëtitia Roux, Mireia Miró Varela and Séverine Pont-Combe and a full hour and a half ahead of the bronze laureats. Said Forsberg a few days later: "I almost feel like I could finish my career." As in Skyrunning she competes in all ski mountaineering distances, as well as team events. She is also able to transition fast from winter to summer events and vice versa; one week after winning the 2015 Trofeo Mezzalama race on skis she won the  Transvulcania by half an hour for her first Skyrunner World Series win of the season. Forsberg herself keeps a low profile; in a 2013 interview she answered the question "What are your strengths in ski mountaineering?" thus: "Hmm. I don't have any direct strengths. I'm a bit mediocre both uphill and downhill, I'd say."

Forsberg was a member of the Salomon team from 2012 to 2022, and was actively involved in the company's product development for trail running. In 2022 Forsberg joined the team of Nnormal, a company co-founded by her partner Kilian Jornet.

In 2014 Forsberg and Jornet initiated and organized the first edition of the Tromsø SkyRace in Tromsø, Norway, part of the Skyrunner® World series from 2015.
Forsberg does not have a trainer. Says Forsberg: "I like best to control everything myself. Moreover, there is no coach who thinks it is a good approach to compete in two seasons. So I go on my own."

Due to pregnancy and the COVID-19 pandemic Forsberg did not run or ski many races in 2019 and 2020.

ACL surgery
During the 2016 European Championships of Ski Mountaineering Forsberg broke her cruciate ligament on February 5 after a fellow competitor ran over her skis from behind. She had to abandon a season that had started better than ever, with Forsberg leading the International Ski Mountaineering Federation's World Cup Individual discipline. Prior to this serious injury Forsberg claimed that she had only been injured once (in the Transvulcania incident where she was pushed from behind running uphill), which she credits to taking good care of herself. Forsberg: "And also my love for pastries!". The ACL recovery process has been the subject of many Facebook and blog postings on Forsberg's part, including both rehab training and philosophy. Forsberg: "I think it's important to recognize hopelessness sometimes, but only for a short period of time, so it is important to seize the little hope that is there."

After her ACL surgery in early February 2016 Forsberg made her comeback in mid-June with three local Norwegian races where she ran uphill and walked downhill. On July 23 Forsberg won the Kendall Mountain run in Colorado and on August 5 the Blåmann Vertical km in Tromsø, Norway, that is part of the Skyrunner World Series. On August 28 Forsberg was back on the top international skyrunning scene after winning the biennial Trofeo Kima on her third attempt; in 2012 and 2014 she finished 2nd.

Two weeks after the skiing accident Forsberg started to practise yoga as one path to recovery. In August 2016 she announced in an interview: "I’m travelling to India to do the final 200 hours of yoga teacher training. I think it’ll be pretty intense."

Mountaineering
In April 2017 Forsberg announced that she and Kilian Jornet would attempt to climb Cho Oyu, a Himalayan peak of 8,188 meters, with a light and fast style spending only two weeks away from home. As preparation the pair slept for two weeks in an altitude tent simulating an altitude of 5,500 to 6,000 meters, and trained for a week at 4,000 meters in the Alps.
After 10 days at base camp a summit attempt was made but Forsberg turned around at 7,700 meters due to worsening weather. Jornet continued but is not sure whether he reached the summit since visibility was near zero. She then returned directly to Europe to start the skyrunning season while Jornet stayed to make an attempt on Mount Everest. After her first race Forsberg commented on social media: "... it was still emotional from being awake the whole night waiting for Kilians message saying he was down. Well, cheers to the start of the season, from now it can only be better!"

Teams
Forsberg has competed for the following teams and clubs:
 Turtagrø Turlag, Norway, 2009 (a mountain lodge where Forsberg worked)
 STF Kebnekaise, Sweden, 2010 (a mountain lodge where Forsberg worked)
 IKSU, Sweden, 2010 (a general sports club at the University of Umeå)
 Dynafit, 2011 (a team sponsored by a sports equipment manufacturer)
 Fjällframfart SK, Sweden, 2012 - (a sports club for alpine sports affiliated with the Swedish Climbing Federation)
 Salomon, 2012 - 2022 (a team sponsored by a sports equipment manufacturer)
 Swedish National Team - Ski mountaineering, 2013 - (selected by the Swedish Climbing Federation)
 Swedish National Team - Ultratrail, 2016 - (selected by the Swedish Athletics Association)
 Öbacka LK, 2016 - (a local running club close to where Forsberg was born)
 Måndalen IL, 2016 - (a local club where Forsberg lives)
 Nnormal, 2022 - (a team sponsored by a sports equipment manufacturer)

Motivation and values
Forsberg in 2016: "I have started to take pride in being a strong athlete, because 2012 I didn’t think at all that I was strong. I just did what I loved and I happened to be good at it. For me now it’s important to know that I can improve, have the motivation for it, and make a plan of how to get my athletic goal fulfilled. Now I also know how hard it is to be a professional athlete, you need to be motivated and never give up!" "Racing has only been a part of my life since four years, but nature and my passion for being outside– running/skiing/climbing/picking berries/walking/having a picnic/ gardening/farming–has always been there and I would not let anything take away my passion for that. That’s who I am… That is who I define myself as. I don’t define myself as a racer or competitor. But yes, I love winning, of course, it’s big, but at the same time it doesn’t matter at all."

In 2015 Forsberg wrote a blog entitled "Relationship mind, body and soul" that was widely cited in media for its balanced approach to food and weight in competitive running. Forsberg's concluding remark: "Love your hips, breasts, butt and belly. The fat keeps you warm. And healthy."
Forsberg says that she follows no restricted diet and takes no food supplements. Forsberg: "I believe everything is good for you in small amount and as natural as possible."

Forsberg is a vegetarian and is fond of gardening. In the garden plot of the house on the outskirts of the valley in Chamonix that Forsberg shared with her boyfriend Kilian Jornet she cultivated green beans, pumpkin, squash, radish, beetroot, various salads, broccoli, cauliflower, and some herbs. Forsberg "It's a dream I've had a long time, to be half self-sufficient and I think about the ecological impact. Thanks to my lifestyle as it looks now, I can give it priority." On the small farm in Måndalen the opportunities for gardening are even better and Forsberg has expanded her ambitions in this area. She also devotes a separate Instagram account to the subject: "Måndalen Country living" (see External links below).

Personal life
In February 2016 Forsberg and Kilian Jornet bought a house in Måndalen in the Rauma municipality in the Norwegian county Møre og Romsdal. In 2017 the Rauma Chamber of Commerce awarded the title "Rauma Ambassador of the Year" to the couple.

Prior to Rauma they lived in a remodelled old mill in the hamlet Montroc outside of Chamonix in France. Both make a living from skyrunning and ski mountaineering.

Forsberg started studies to become a forester in 2005 but decided that the curriculum was not what she had anticipated. Four years later she instead started to study for a master's degree in biology at University of Umeå in Sweden and University of Tromsø in Norway. Her Masters deposition is on hold while she concentrates on training and racing professionally. At the University of Umeå Forsberg participated in the school's program for elite athletes, designed to facilitate academic studies in parallel with intensive training and competition. She loves to bake and eat buns after working a while as a baker. At times her recipes appear on her blog under the heading Recipes from a mountain lover. Forsberg is very active on social media and has over 190 000 followers on Facebook and 300 000 on Instagram (August 2021).

On 7 September 2013 Forsberg and Kílian Jornet were rescued by the PGHM (Peloton de Gendarmerie de Haute Montagne, Mountain Gendarmerie) on the Frendo spur of the North Face of Aiguille du Midi in the Mont Blanc massif close to Chamonix, France, in degenerating weather and with inadequate equipment for the situation. Both were extremely apologetic afterwards.

Forsberg's sister Evy Tess Therese Forsberg is an accomplished sportswoman who has competed on the Scotland women's national rugby sevens team and become European Weightlifting Champion.

In 2018 Forsberg together with fellow athletes Ida Nilsson and Mimmi Kotka started Moonvalley, an on-line shop dedicated to organic energy bars and sportsdrinks.

Forsberg gave birth to a daughter on 24 March 2019 (with Jornet as father). The couple's second daughter was born on 15 April 2021.

Results

Skyrunning
The following list includes Forsberg's results in skyrunning. Some of the early events are not skyrunning, but rather traditional trail runs. These are included for the sake of completeness.

Some races are denoted as VK and others as vertical km; in both cases it means that runners go up a steep hill with  vertical elevation difference between start and finish.

2009
 1st, Fjällmaraton , Sweden

2010
 1st, Björkliden Arctic Mountain Marathon (BAMM) , Sweden, over two days, with Linda Berg
 47th, Lidingöloppet , Sweden
 3rd, Molden Opp, VK, Norway

2011
 1st, Fjällmaraton , Sweden (2nd victory)
 1st, Salomon Trail Tour Åre , Sweden
 1st, Björkliden Arctic Mountain Marathon (BAMM), Sweden,  over two days, with Linda Berg (2nd straight victory)
 2nd, Besseggløpet , Norway
 1st, Drakloppet , Sweden
 17th, Lidingöloppet , Sweden

2012
 Winner of the World Championship in the Skyrunner® World Series
 Winner of Salomon Trail Tour Sweden (2nd straight victory)
 1st, Salomon Trail Tour Kristianstad , Kristianstad, Sweden
 1st, KolmårdsTrailen , Sweden
 1st, Skatås Ryggar , Sweden
 1st, Salomon Trail Tour Sälen , Sweden
 3rd, Salomon Trail Tour Spring Cross , Sweden
 2nd, Yorkshire Three Peaks Race , UK
 3rd, Maratòn Alpina Zegama-Aizkorri , Spain
 1st, Kilian's Classik , France
 1st, Dolomites SkyRace , Italy (new record)
 5th, Giir di Mont , Italy
 1st, Pikes Peak Marathon , Colorado, USA (new downhill record)
 2nd, Trofeo Kima , Italy
 3rd, Cavalls del Vent , Spain (later renamed Ultra Pirineu)
 1st, 26th Mt. Kinabalu Climbathon , Borneo, Malaysia
 2nd, Grand Trail des Templiers , France
 1st, The North Face Endurance Challenge , San Francisco, USA

2013
 Winner of the World Cup in the ultra skyrace series
 European Champion in skyrunning (Dolomites SkyRace)
 European Champion in ultra distance skyrunning (Trans D'Havet)
 2nd, World cup of skyrunning
 1st, Salomon Trail Tour Sälen , Sweden (2nd straight victory)
 1st, Drakloppet , Sweden (2nd victory)
 1st, Transgrancanaria marathon , Spain
 1st, Transvulcania , Spain
 2nd, European Championship in Vertical km (Dolomites Vertical Kilometer)
 1st, Maratòn Alpina Zegama-Aizkorri , Spain
 2nd, Marathon du Mont Blanc , France
 1st, Ice Trail Tarentaise , France (new course record)
 1st, Dolomites SkyRace , Italy (2nd victory, also 2013 European Championship in skyrunning distance skyrunning)
 1st, Trans D'Havet , Italy (also 2013 European Championship in ultra distance skyrunning)
 1st, Matterhorn Ultraks , Switzerland
 1st, UROC , Colorado, USA
 3rd, Limone Extreme  Italy
 2nd, Grand Raid de la Réunion (aka La diagonale des fous) , Réunion, France
 3rd, The North Face Endurance Challenge , San Francisco, USA
 1st, Eideløpene VK, Norway

2014
 Winner of the Skyrunning World Series Ultra distance (2nd straight victory)
 World Champion in ultra distance skyrunning (Mont-Blanc 80K race)
 2nd, Grimpée du Semnoz , France
 4th, Maratòn Alpina Zegama-Aizkorri , Spain
 1st, Mont-Blanc 80 km (84 km in 2014), France (also 2014 World Championship in ultra distance skyrunning)
 1st, Resegup Skyrace , Italy
 1st, Run Richmond Park , London, UK (not a skyrunning race)
 1st, Ice Trail Tarantaise , France (2nd victory)
 2nd, Dolomites SkyRace , Italy
 1st, Giir di Mont , Italy
 5th, Matterhorn Ultraks , Switzerland
 1st, Fjällmaraton , Sweden (3rd victory, new course record) 
 1st, Ottfjället upp , Sweden (new course record)
 2nd, Trofeo Kima , Italy
 1st, The Rut 50K, 50 km Montana, USA
 16th, Limone Extreme , Italy
 2nd, Chandolin 2 x VK, Switzerland

2015
 Winner of the World Cup in the ultra skyrace series (3rd straight victory, participated in 5 ultra series races; won all)
 European Champion in ultra distance skyrunning (Ice Trail Tarentaise)
 3rd, Transvulcania Vertical km, Spain
 1st, Transvulcania , Spain (2nd victory)
 4th, Maratòn Alpina Zegama-Aizkorri , Spain
 1st, Verticale du Môle Vertical km, France
 1st, Samoëns Trail Tour Verticale du Criou Vertical km, France
 1st, Samoëns Trail Tour Trail Découverte , France
 8th, Mont-Blanc Vertical KM
 2nd, Mont Blanc 10 km, France
 1st, Mount Marathon Race ,  vertical return, Alaska, USA (new uphill, downhill and total records)
 9th, Face de Bellevarde Vertical km, France
 1st, Ice Trail Tarentaise , France (3rd straight victory, also 2015 European Championship, Ultra skyrunning)
 14th, Dolomites SkyRace Vertical km, Italy
 4th, Dolomites SkyRace , Italy
 1st, Blåmann Vertical km, Norway
 1st, Tromsø SkyRace , Norway
 1st, Glen Coe Skyline , Scotland (2nd overall)
 4th, The Rut - Lone Peak Vertical km, Big Sky Resort, Montana, USA
 5th, The Rut - , Big Sky Resort, Montana, USA
 1st, The Rut - , Big Sky Resort, Montana, USA (2nd straight victory, new course record after racing three days in a row)
 1st, Ultra Pirineu , Bagà, Spain
 2nd, Altitrail de Chalin 12 km and  vertical, Switzerland

2016
 8th, Dalsnibba Run , Norway (first competitive event after ACL surgery in February)
 3rd, Lomseggen Upp Vertical km, Norway
 7th, Besseggløpet , Norway
 1st, Kendall Mountain Run , Colorado, USA
 1st, Blåmann Vertical km, Norway (2nd straight victory)
 2nd, Stranda Fjord Trail Race , Norway
 1st, Trofeo Kima , Italy
 1st, Trail de l'Arclusaz , France

2017
 1st, Åndalsnesløpet , Norway
 6th, Zegama-Aizkorri VK, Spain
 8th, Maratòn Alpina Zegama-Aizkorri , Spain
 2nd, Dalsnibba Run , Norway
 1st, Mefjellet Opp, Vertical km, Norway
 1st, Salomon 27K , Sweden
 2nd, Blåmann Vertical km, Norway
 1st, Klauva Opp, Vertical km, Norway (course record)
 4th, Skåla Opp, 1.8 vertical km, Norway
 2nd Ultra-Trail Orsières - Champex - Chamonix (OCC) , France
 3rd Salomon Mamores VK, Scotland
 1st Glen Coe Skyline , Scotland (new course record)
 3rd, Grand Trail des Templiers , France

2018
 1st, Bodom Trail , Finland (new course record)
 7th, Maratòn Alpina Zegama-Aizkorri , Spain
 2nd, Ultra Skymarathon Madeira , Portugal
 1st, Lomseggen Upp Vertical km, Norway (new course record)
 3rd, Monte Rosa SkyMarathon , Italy, competing in the male category in team with Kilian Jornet (female Fastest Known Time)

2019
 6th, Dalsnibba Run , Norway
 1st, Romsdalseggenløpet , Norway
 4th, Sky Pirineu , Spain

2021
 1st, Alle på Jensbu (Vertical km), Norway
 2nd, Dalsnibba Run , Norway
 1st, Romsdalseggenløpet , Norway (second straight win)
 4th, Molde 7 Topper , Norway

2022
 1st, Zegama-Aizkorri VK, Spain
 24th, Maratòn Alpina Zegama-Aizkorri , Spain
 1st, Dalsnibba Run , Norway
 1st, Besseggløpet , Norway (female course record, 3rd overall)
 1st, Isfjorden Skyrace , Norway
 1st, Mefjellet Opp, Vertical km, Norway (2nd overall)
 3rd, Stranda Fjord Trail Race , Norway
 3rd, Ultra Pirineu , Spain

Skyrunning World Series wins
The Skyrunning World Series is a race circuit for mountain running from 2002 and onwards.

Ski mountaineering

The following list includes Forsberg's results in ISMF ski mountaineering races.

World Cup wins

La Grand Course wins

Fastest Known Time (FKT)
Forsberg holds the fastest known times on the following routes: 

 

 Grand Teton, Wyoming, USA, Women's FKT up and down, 3h51m, August 11, 2012.
 Mont Blanc, France, Women's FKT up and down from Chamonix, 7h53m12s, June 21, 2018 (improved her previous record of 8h10m from 2013).
 Matterhorn, Italy, Women's FKT up and down, 5h52m, 2013.
 Kebnekaise, Sweden, Women's FKT up and down, 2h00m40s, 7 July 2014. Until 5 August 2014 this was also the Allround FKT.
 Teide, Spain, Women's FKT up and down, 7h06m06s, 23 November 2017.
 Galdhøpiggen, Norway,  on ski (from Spiterstulen), Women's FKT up and down 1h45m, 27 April 2018. Most FKT in the list are running, but to Galdhøpiggen was on ski (skis have similar speed uphill but are much faster downhill).
 Monte Rosa, Italy, from Alagna, Women's FKT up and down 5h3m56s, 23 June 2018
 Kungsleden (King of Trails), Allround FKT Abisko - Hemavan, Sweden, 4d 21h 45m 28s, 2–7 July 2018.

Bibliography
 Emelie Forsberg, Sky Runner: Finding Strength, Happiness and Balance in Your Running, Swedish, English, French, Norwegian, Italian, Spanish and Catalan editions, Gawellförlag AB, 2018 
 Emelie Forsberg, Ida Nilsson, Mimmi Kotka, Moonvalley DIARIES, Swedish, English and French, Gawellförlag AB, 2019

Notes

References

External links
Emelie Forsberg
 
 
  (general subjects)
  (specifically about country living in Måndalen)
 
 Emelie Forsberg on Movescount (In Swedish)
 Emelie Forsberg's profile at DUV
 Emelie Forsberg's profile at ITRA
Skyrunning
 International Skyrunning Federation website
 Skyrunner World Series website
 Vertical Kilometer World Circuit website
Ski mountaineering
 International Ski Mountaineering website

1986 births
Living people
Swedish mountain runners
Swedish ultramarathon runners
Swedish female long-distance runners
Swedish female ski mountaineers
Female ultramarathon runners
Swedish sky runners
Skyrunning World Championships winners
People from Kramfors Municipality
Sportspeople from Västernorrland County